Alternative periodic tables are tabulations of chemical elements differing in their organization from the traditional depiction of the periodic system.

Over a thousand have been devised, often for didactic reasons, as not all correlations of properties between the chemical elements are effectively captured by the standard periodic table.

Major alternative structures

Left-step periodic table (Janet, 1928)
Charles Janet's left-step periodic table is the most widely used alternative to the traditional depiction of the periodic system. It organizes elements according to an idealized orbital filling (instead of valence). For example, the elements Sc to Zn are shown as a 3d block implying orbital occupancy [Ar] 4s2 3dx. (Although Cr and Cu are exceptions in the gas-phase, the idealized configurations are not too far away from the ground state, and the energy difference is small enough to be controlled by the chemical environment.)

Compared to the common layout, the left-step table has these changes:
 Helium is placed in group 2 (not in group 18).
 Groups 1 and 2 (the s-block) are moved to the right side of the table.
 The s-block is shifted upwards one row, thus all elements not in the s-block are now one row lower than in the standard table. For example, most of the fourth row in the standard table is the fifth row in this table.
The resulting order is still consistently by atomic number (Z).

Two-dimensional spiral (Benfey, 1964)
In Theodor Benfey's periodic table the elements form a two-dimensional spiral, starting from hydrogen, and folding their way around two peninsulas, the transition metals, and lanthanides and actinides. A superactinide island is already slotted in. The Benfey table has some unique aspects that very few tables represent. An example of this is the placement hydrogen has in the spiral. In most tables, hydrogen seems like the "odd one out". The reason for this is because hydrogen, whilst having the same valence electron configuration as the alkali metals, has the properties of a halogen. The Benfey table gets around this conundrum by expanding the hydrogen box around both the alkali metals and the halogens.

Three-dimensional, flower-like (Paul Giguère, 1966)
Paul Giguère's 3-D periodic table consists of four connected billboards with the elements written on the front and the back. The first billboard has the group 1 elements on the front and the group 2 elements at the back, with hydrogen and helium omitted altogether. At a 90° angle the second billboard contains the groups 13 to 18 front and back. Two more billboards each making 90° angles contain the other elements.

Three-dimensional, physicist's (Timothy Stowe, 1986)
Timothy Stowe's physicist's periodic table is three-dimensional with the three axes representing the principal quantum number, orbital quantum number, and orbital magnetic quantum number. Helium is again a group 2 element.

Elements repeating (Ronald L. Rich, 2005)
Ronald L. Rich has proposed a periodic table where elements appear more than once when appropriate. He notes that hydrogen shares properties with group 1 elements based on valency, with group 17 elements because hydrogen is a non-metal but also with the carbon group based on similarities in chemical bonding to transition metals and a similar electronegativity. In this rendition of the periodic table carbon and silicon also appear in the same group as titanium and zirconium.

ADOMAH (Valery Tsimmerman, 2006)

The ADOMAH table is an adaptation of the left step table. Each strictly vertical column of the table has the same value of the principal quantum number n. For example, n = 3 for Fe. Each block of elements has the same value of the secondary quantum number l. For example, l = 2 for Fe. Each element entry together with all preceding elements corresponds to the electron configuration of that element (with 20 exceptions out of 118 known elements). For example, the electron configuration of Fe is determined by starting at H, which is 1s1, and counting in atomic number order. This gives a configuration of 1s2 2s2 2p6 3s2 3p6 4s2 3d6 or, in short form, [Ar] 4s2 3d6.

The four blocks of the ADOMAH table can be rearranged such that they fit, equidistantly spaced, inside a regular tetrahedron. The latter, in turn, fits into a cube.

Discoid Periodic Table (Muzzammil Qureshi, 2021)

Muzzammil Qureshi's periodic table consists of concentric circles format giving it a more organic and more unified sense than the tabular formats. Discoid means "circular in shape". This table instead of having "groups" and "periods” possesses "families" and "arcs" for the representation of elements. All the elements in the column are identified vertically by their Family name using the topmost element name. For example, lithium family, beryllium family, and so on. Elements are identified horizontally using the number of arcs. For example, 1st arc, 2nd arc, etc. The periodic table is divided into two parts, namely part A and part B. Part A represents the main-group elements, whereas Part B represents the transition metals.

Salient Features of this table include:

 Hydrogen and helium are placed at the center of the table, from where it shall share many interstitial chemical properties with other elements of different families.
 Lanthanides and actinides are added along with d-block elements without disturbing the overall periodicity of the table.
 The transition metals are modified by having no groups because all transition metals are chemically and physically similar.

Variants of the classical layout 
From Mendeleev's original periodic table, elements have been basically arranged by valence (groups in columns) and the repetition therein (periods in rows). Over the years and with discoveries in atomic structure, this schema has been adjusted and expanded, but not changed as a principle.

The oldest periodic table is the short form table (columns I–VIII) by Dmitri Mendeleev, which shows secondary chemical kinships. For example, the alkali metals and the coinage metals (copper, silver, gold) are in the same column because both groups tend to have a valence of one. This format is still used by many, as shown by this Russian short form table (2013), which includes all elements and element names until roentgenium.

H. G. Deming used the so-called long periodic table (18 columns) in his textbook "General Chemistry", which appeared in the US for the first time in 1923 (Wiley), and was the first to designate the first two and the last five main groups with the notation "A", and the intervening transition groups with the notation "B".

The numeration was chosen so that the characteristic oxides of the B groups would correspond to those of the A groups. The iron, cobalt, and nickel groups were designated neither A nor B. The noble-gas group was originally attached (by Deming) to the left side of the periodic table. The group was later switched to the right side and usually labeled as group VIIIA.

Extension of the periodic table 
In the extended periodic table, suggested by Glenn T. Seaborg in 1969, yet unknown elements are included up to atomic number 168. Theoretical periods above regular period 7 are added.

In the research field of superatoms, clusters of atoms have properties of single atoms of another element. It is suggested to extend the periodic table with a second layer to be occupied with these cluster compounds. An example addition to this multi-story table is the aluminium cluster ion , which behaves like a multivalent germanium atom.

In October 2020, scientists reported a nonempirical way of presenting Mendeleev Numbers, and organizing the chemical space.

Gallery

References

Further reading 
A 1974 review of the tables then known is considered a definitive work on the topic: Mazurs, E. G. Graphical Representations of the Periodic System During One Hundred Years. Alabama; University of Alabama Press, 1974, .
Hjørland, Birger (2011). The periodic table and the philosophy of classification. Knowledge Organization, 38(1), 9–21.

External links 
Representing the Periodic Table in Different Ways a site curated by the Michigan State University Alumni Association Knowledge Network
Robert Harrison's modern spiral periodic table
Janet's Left Step Periodic Table
Correction to Physicist periodic table offered by Jeries Rihani as Meitnerium occupies the position that Hassium should have.
A Wired Article on Alternate Periodic Tables
A Selection of Periodic Tables
http://periodicspiral.com/ arranges the periodic table in a (hexagonal) spiral.
Rotaperiod.com A new periodic table.
Note on the T-shirt topology of the Z-spiral.
 New Periodic Table of the Elements this is in a square-triangular periodic arrangement.
Periodic Table based on electron configurations
Database of Periodic Tables
Periodic Fractal of the Elements
 Bob Doyle Periodic Table of the Elements A regrouping by properties used to better explain electron grouping
 Eric Scerri's website about the periodic table
Earth Scientist's Periodic Table

Periodic table